is a Japanese chemist and professor of chemistry at University of Tokyo in Japan.

Education
 1973 BS Faculty of Science, Tokyo Institute of Technology (Professor Teruaki Mukaiyama)
 1978 PhD in chemistry, Department of Chemistry, Tokyo Institute of Technology (Professor Isao Kuwajima)
 1978-1980 Postdoctoral Research Associate, Department of Chemistry, Columbia University, New York (Professor Gilbert Stork)

Major research interests
 catalyst chemistry, fullerene chemistry, supramolecular chemistry, organic solar cells, Transmission electron microscopy.

Academic experience
 1980-1984 Assistant Professor, Department of Chemistry, Tokyo Institute of Technology
 1984-1993 Associate Professor, Department of Chemistry, Tokyo Institute of Technology
 1989-1991 Adjunct Associate Professor, Department of Applied Molecular Science, Institute for Molecular Science
 1993-1995 Professor, Department of Chemistry, Tokyo Institute of Technology
 1995–present Professor, Department of Chemistry, The University of Tokyo
 2004-2010 ERATO Nakamura Functional Carbon Cluster program research director, Japan Science and Technology Agency (JST)
 2007- The University of Tokyo, Chemistry Innovation Global COE Program Leader
 2008-2009 Chairman, Department of Chemistry, The University of Tokyo

Professional functions
 2003-2006 Senior Program Officer in Chemistry, Japan Society for the Promotion of Science (JSPS), Research Center for Science Systems
 2006-2008 Corresponding Member of the Science Council of Japan
 2006-2007 Senior Program Officer (on funding scheme study), The Japan Society for the Promotion of Science (JSPS)
 2011- Program Director and Chair, Japan Agency for Science and Technology (JST)
 2009-2011 Kaiteki Institute Co. Advisory board member
 2012 Visiting Professorship for Senior International Scientists, ICCAS, Beijing, China
 May 21, 2015 Visiting Professorship for Nanjing University, Nanjing, China
 May 23, 2015 Visiting Professorship for Nanjing University of Technology, Nanjing, China

Awards and honors
 Young Chemists Award (Chemical Society of Japan, 1984)
 Yamanouchi Award in Synthetic Organic Chemistry (1991)
 Tejima Memorial Award (Tokyo Institute of Technology, 1992)
 The Japan IBM Science Prize (1993)
 Nagoya Silver Medal for Organic Chemistry (2001)
 The Chemical Society of Japan Award (2003)
 Humboldt Research Award (2006)
 The Medal with Purple Ribbon (Shiju Hosho) (His Majesty of Japan, 2009)
 the Arthur C. Cope Scholar Award of ACS (2010)
 Elected Fellow of the American Association for the Advancement of Science (1998)
 Elected Foreign Fellow of the Royal Society of Chemistry (U. K., 2005)
 Honorary Foreign Member of the American Academy of Arts and Sciences (2008)
 Honorary Member of the Israel Chemical Society (2009)

Special lectureships
 R. C. Fuson Visiting Professor, University of Illinois (1990)
 Syntex Distinguished Lectureship. Colorado State University (1996)
 Parke Davis-Warner Lambert Distinguished Lectureship, Ohio State University (1997)
 Troisieme Cycle Lectureship, Switzerland (2000)
 Van der Kerk Lectureship, University of Utrecht (2001)
 Lady Davis Fellowship, Technion, Israel (2002-3)
 Alfred Blomquist Lectureship, Cornell (2003)
 Rhodia Lecturer, French Chemical Society (2004)
 Chinese Academy of Science Lectureship, (Beijing, 2004)
 Gilbert Stork Lecture, Columbia University (2006)
 William Dauben Memorial Lectureship, University of California, Berkeley (2006)
 Novartis Chemistry Lectureship (2006-7)
 Wyeth Lectureship, University of Pennsylvania (2007)
 Campus Lecturer, Institut Catala d’Investigacle Quimica (Tarragona, 2007)
 H. C. Brown Lecture, Purdue University (2008)
 W. S. Johnson Lecture, Stanford University (2008)

Editorial service

Associate editor
 Journal of Synthetic Organic Chemistry Japan (1986–88 and 1998-2000)
 Chemistry Letters (1992–98)
 Organic Letters (2000-2005)
 Journal of the American Chemical Society (2009-)

Editorial board
 Journal of Molecular Catalysis (1994-2003)
 Ultrasonics Sonochemistry (1994-2003)
 Topics in Stereochemistry (1996-2006)
 Journal of Organometallic Chemistry (2002-2005)
 Organic and Biomolecular Chemistry (2003-2012)
 Organic Letters (2006-2008)
 Accounts of Chemical Research (2006-2008)
 Chemistry-An Asian Journal (2006-2009)
 Angewandte Chemie (International Advisory Board: 2006-2009)
 Chemistry-An Asian Journal (International Advisory Board: 2009-)

Other
Chairman/Founder, Tateshina Conference on Organic Chemistry (2000-2010)
Advisory Committee, Institute of Chemistry, Academia Sinica, Taiwan (2001-2007)
International Advisory Board, The Sixteenth International Conference on Physical Organic Chemistry (2002)

References

External links
 Nakamura Lab.

1951 births
Living people
Japanese chemists
Academic staff of the University of Tokyo
Academic staff of Tokyo Institute of Technology
Tokyo Institute of Technology alumni
Columbia Graduate School of Arts and Sciences alumni